A dry spell is a weather condition

Books
"Dry Spell", poem by Ellen Hopkins
A Dry Spell, horror novel by Susie Moloney 1997
A Dry Spell, romantic novel by Clare Chambers 2001

Music  
"Dry Spell" (Burgess, James) by Johnny Hallyday from Rough Town 1994
"Dry Spell", song by Myka Relocate. from Lies to Light the Way
"Dry Spell", song by reggae band Pepper from Kona Town
"Dry Spell", song by the funk group The Meters from Funky Miracle
"Dry Spell", song by Casey Abrams, written Abrams, Friedman, Sheyne from Casey Abrams (album)